Zeng Guoqiang (Chinese: 曾国强; born 1965 in Dongguan, Guangdong) is a Male Chinese weightlifter. By winning the 52 kg class weightlifting at the 23rd Olympic Games in 1984, he became China's first Olympic gold medalist in weightlifting.

Major performances
1983 World Youth Championships - 1st 52 kg
1984 Los Angeles Olympic Games - 1st 52 kg
1984 World Championships - 1st 52 kg C&J & total
1984 Asian Championships - 1st 52 kg snatch, C&J & total
1985 World Championships - 2nd 52 kg C&J & total

Honors
1984 - Named Best Athlete at the 16th Asian Championships

References
  - China Daily
 Factbox on Chinese weightlifting

Chinese male weightlifters
Olympic gold medalists for China
Olympic weightlifters of China
Weightlifters at the 1984 Summer Olympics
1965 births
Living people
Olympic medalists in weightlifting
Medalists at the 1984 Summer Olympics
Weightlifters from Guangdong
People from Dongguan
Asian Games medalists in weightlifting
Weightlifters at the 1986 Asian Games
Asian Games silver medalists for China
Medalists at the 1986 Asian Games
20th-century Chinese people